IU International University of Applied Sciences (German: IU Internationale Hochschule) is a private, state-recognized University of Applied Sciences based in Erfurt, Germany.

It offers campus-based in-person, distance and blended-learning programs in German and English. With over 100,000 enrolled students, IU is the largest state-accredited university in Germany as of the summer semester of 2021.

History 
IU was founded in 1998 as the International University of Applied Sciences Bad Honnef / Bonn (IFH), and its first intake took place in the winter semester of 2000/2001 with 23 students.

In July 2009, the German Science and Humanities Council institutionally accredited the university for ten years, followed by reaccreditation for another five years in 2021. In 2010, it became a member of the German Rectors' Conference.

In mid-2013, IU merged with Adam Ries University of Applied Sciences in Erfurt, another private university, expanding its offerings to include the dual study model. In March 2016, it merged with the University of International Business and Logistics (HIWL) in Bremen and has since started offering dual study programs at this location.

In October 2017, it was renamed to IUBH International University of Applied Sciences. In March 2021, another renaming took place to IU International University of Applied Sciences. In 2019, the registered office of the university was moved to Erfurt.

Organization 
The university has been state-recognized since 1999 and accredited by the German Science and Humanities Council in 2009 and 2021. The study programs as well as the university's internal quality management ("system accreditation") are additionally accredited by the Foundation for International Business Administration Accreditation (FIBAA) on behalf of the German Accreditation Council.

The sponsor of the university is IU Internationale Hochschule GmbH, whose sole shareholder since 2007 has been Career Partner GmbH (since 2021: IU Group N.V.). The latter has been owned by the British investor group Oakley since 2017; previously, it was owned by the Munich-based investment firm Auctus from 2007 to 2015, and by the U.S.-based Apollo Group from 2015 to 2017.

The university's governing bodies are the rectorate, the senate, and an advisory board to represent the professional interests of the departments and companies.

Locations 
In addition to a "virtual campus," the university currently operates 28 campus locations: Augsburg, Bad Honnef, Berlin, Bielefeld, Braunschweig, Bremen, Cologne, Dortmund, Dresden, Duisburg, Düsseldorf, Erfurt, Essen, Frankfurt, Freiburg, Hamburg, Hanover, Karlsruhe, Leipzig, Lübeck, Mainz, Mannheim, Munich, Münster, Nuremberg, Peine (until the end of 2021), Stuttgart and Ulm. In 2022, the following locations are to be added: Aachen, Bochum, Kassel, Kiel, Mönchengladbach, Potsdam, Ravensburg, Regensburg, Rostock, Saarbrücken, and Wuppertal.

Examination centers for distance learning are available worldwide at every Goethe-Institut location.

Study Programmes 
IU International University offers around 200 Bachelor's, Master's and MBA degree programs in various study formats (face-to-face in-person, distance learning, combined studies, myStudies, dual studies), in the following subject areas:

 Design, Architecture & Construction
 Health
 Hospitality, Tourism & Events
 Human Resources
 IT & Technology
 Marketing & Communication
 Social Sciences
 Transportation & Logistics
 Business & Management

References

External links 

IU International University of Applied Sciences

Business schools in Germany
Universities and colleges in North Rhine-Westphalia